Andriy Valeriyovych Pyatov (born 28 June 1984) is a Ukrainian professional footballer who plays as a goalkeeper for the Ukrainian Premier League club Shakhtar Donetsk.

Club career

Artemida Kirovohrad
Pyatov started his career in Kirovohrad playing for amateur club Artemida (sponsored by a former local liquor factory Artemida) in the 2000 Amateur League when he was still 15 years old.

Vorskla-2 Poltava
In 2001 Pyatov moved to Poltava where he at first joined Vorskla Poltava junior teams and its second team in lower leagues. In Poltava he spent five seasons. His debut at professional level Pyatov made for Vorskla-2 during the 2000–01 season in the away game against Elektron Romny on 25 March 2001 in Romny, which his team lost 3–1.

Vorskla Poltava
His debut in the Vyshcha Liha (now Ukrainian Premier League) for the Vorskla senior squad Pyatov made at the end of the 2002–03 season on 18 June 2003 when Vorskla was hosting Illichivets Mariupol in a game that finished with a 1–1 draw.

Shakhtar Donetsk

He was bought by Shakhtar from Vorskla for approximately £880,000 on 13 December 2006. He spent the rest of the 2006–07 season on loan at Vorskla Poltava. In the 2007–08 season, Pyatov replaced Bohdan Shust as the main goalkeeper of Shakhtar Donetsk, playing in league, cup, and UEFA Champions League matches, keeping two clean sheets. For the 2008–2009 season Pyatov had some  serious competition for his No.1 spot as Shakhtar loaned out Bohdan Shust, and signed FC Kharkiv 'keeper Rustam Khudzhamov who is reaching his prime and saved FC Kharkiv from relegation. But after Shakhtars' 2–0 loss to FC Lviv, Pyatov regained his place as the clubs' No.1. In a home Champions League fixture against Barcelona Pyatov made seven crucial saves as Shakhtar were leading 1–0, until Bojan Krkić sent in a cross which was spilled by Pyatov for Lionel Messi to easily tap in to make it 1–1 in the 85th minute. But things went from bad to worse as another cross was sent in, Messi rose and headed home giving Barcelona the win, and ruining Pyatov's perfect game. Pyatov cemented his spot as Shakhtar's No.1 after great performances in the 2008–09 UEFA Cup which saw Shakhtar reach the final, beating fellow Ukrainian giants Dynamo Kyiv in the first ever all Ukrainian semi-final. His appearance in the final was marred as he spilled Naldo's freekick into the net to give Werder Bremen an equaliser but Shakhtar won 2–1 in extra time. On 1 November 2009, against Chornomorets Odessa Pyatov played his 100th game for Shakhtar (conceded 72 goals over the course of these matches), and in this game he won the Man of the Match, and is also the 1st time coach (Mircea Lucescu) ever named a goalkeeper Man of the Match.

In 2015, Pyatov broke the record of penalties stopped in European competitions by stopping his fourth penalty, a record previously held by Shovkovskyi.

International career

Pyatov was a member of the Ukraine national U-21 team where he has played 20 matches. He was also part of Ukraine's 2006 World Cup squad which got to the quarter-finals.

Pyatov made his senior debut for Ukraine in 2007. Since then, he has gone on to make over 90 appearances for the Ukraine national team. He started the 2010 FIFA World Cup qualifying campaign with a clean sheet against Belarus to help Ukraine win 1–0 in Lviv. In the 0–0 draw against Croatia, Pyatov was instrumental in denying Luka Modrić on two occasions, and as well as other to secure a point for his country. In November 2013 Pyatov set a new record of minutes without a goal for the national team, beating the record of Oleksandr Shovkovskyi.

In May 2021, despite playing a limited role for his club side during the 2020–21 season, Pyatov was included in the final 26-man squad for the rescheduled UEFA Euro 2020 tournament.

Pyatov played his 102nd and final international match on 11 June 2022, starting in a 3–0 win over Armenia.

Career statistics

Club

International

Ambassador 
Andriy Pyatov was the first brand ambassador of Ukrainian bank sportbank.

Honours
Shakhtar Donetsk
Vyshcha Liha/Ukrainian Premier League: 2007–08, 2009–10, 2010–11, 2011–12, 2012–13, 2013–14, 2016–17, 2017–18, 2018–19, 2019–20
Ukrainian Cup: 2007–08, 2010–11, 2011–12, 2012–13, 2015–16, 2016–17, 2017–18, 2018–19
Ukrainian Super Cup: 2008, 2010, 2012, 2013, 2014, 2015, 2017, 2021
UEFA Cup: 2008–09

Ukraine U21
 UEFA European Under-21 Championship runner-up: 2006

Individual
Ukrainian Premier League Best Goalkeeper: 2009–10, 2013–14, 2015–16, 2016–17, 2017–18, 2018–19
Ukrainian Premier League Footballer of the Year: 2010

References

External links

Profile at Official Shakhtar website

1984 births
Living people
Sportspeople from Kropyvnytskyi
Ukrainian footballers
Association football goalkeepers
FC Artemida Kirovohrad players
FC Vorskla Poltava players
FC Vorskla-2 Poltava players
FC Shakhtar Donetsk players
UEFA Europa League winning players
Ukrainian Premier League players
Ukrainian Second League players
Ukrainian Amateur Football Championship players
Ukraine under-21 international footballers
Ukraine international footballers
2006 FIFA World Cup players
UEFA Euro 2012 players
UEFA Euro 2016 players
UEFA Euro 2020 players
FIFA Century Club